"I Think About It All the Time" is a song written by Billy Livsey and Don Schlitz, and recorded by American country music artist John Berry. It was released in June 1995 as the second single from the album Standing on the Edge.  The song reached number 4 on the Billboard Hot Country Singles & Tracks chart.

Chart performance
"I Think About It All the Time" debuted at number 59 on the U.S. Billboard Hot Country Singles & Tracks for the week of July 8, 1995.

Year-end charts

References

1995 singles
1995 songs
John Berry (country singer) songs
Songs written by Billy Livsey
Songs written by Don Schlitz
Song recordings produced by Jimmy Bowen
Liberty Records singles